The Sevens is a purpose-built rugby sevens stadium in Dubai, United Arab Emirates. The Sevens Stadium is a venue for rugby, association football, Gaelic football, Australian football (Aussie rules football), netball, basketball, cricket, tennis, track and field and concerts.

The Sevens is located at the intersection of the Dubai-Al Ain Road (E66) and the Jebel Ali-Lahbab Road (E77) and the complex offers parking for around 15,000 vehicles.

Facilities at The Sevens include: eight rugby/football pitches, six cricket pitches (3 grass (2 floodlit) 3 subkha), four netball/tennis courts, one basketball court, a grandstand, and international-standard ancillary facilities ideal for sports events. All courts and pitches are floodlit.

It was the venue for the first HSBC A5N Youth Rugby Festival in February 2009. The Emirates Airline Dubai Sevens is a round of the World Rugby Sevens Series held at The Sevens annually since 2008.

Concerts

Rod Stewart performed at the stadium on 7 March 2010 during his Soulbook Tour.
Duran Duran performed at the stadium on 8 March 2012 during their All You Need Is Now Tour.
Justin Bieber has performed at the stadium on 4 and 5 May 2013 during his Believe Tour in front of a total crowd of 28,544 people.
One Direction performed at the stadium on 4 April 2015 during their On the Road Again Tour in front of a total crowd of 29,300 people.
Kylie Minogue performed at the stadium on 6 December 2019 as a celebration of the Rugby 7s 50th year.

References

External links
 The Sevens official website

Sports venues in Dubai
Rugby union in Dubai
Rugby union stadiums in the United Arab Emirates
Rugby league stadiums in the United Arab Emirates
Football venues in the United Arab Emirates
Cricket grounds in the United Arab Emirates
Netball venues in the United Arab Emirates
Basketball venues in the United Arab Emirates
Australian rules football grounds
Sports venues completed in 2008
2008 establishments in the United Arab Emirates
World Rugby Sevens Series venues